Maria ter Meetelen (20 June 1704, Amsterdam – fl. 1751), was a Dutch writer, famous for writing an autobiographic slave narrative of her years as a slave in Morocco, having been taken captive by Corsair pirates.  Her biography is considered to be a valuable witness statement of the life of a former slave (1748).

Life
Meetelen was a child from the slum. She enlisted in the Spanish army disguised as a man in 1725. After this, she lived in Spain as a nun until she married.

The couple was on a ship destined for the Netherlands in 1731, when it was captured by pirates and all the passengers sold as slaves in Morocco. Her spouse died, and to avoid being taken to the harem of the sultan, Abdallah of Morocco, she refused to convert to Islam and married the spokesperson of the sultan's slaves, Pieter Janszn Iede, the couple provided the non-Muslim slaves with alcohol and lived quite well at the court.

In 1743, the Dutch slaves were bought free by the Dutch state and returned to the Netherlands. She emigrated to South Africa in 1751, where the traces of her disappear.

Works 
 Maria ter Meetelen, The Curious and Amazing Adventures of Maria ter Meetelen; Twelve Years a Slave (1731- 43), Translated and Introduced by Caroline Stone. (Hardinge Simpole, 2010). .

References 

 http://www.inghist.nl/Onderzoek/Projecten/DVN/lemmata/data/Meetelen

1704 births
18th-century deaths
18th-century Dutch people
18th-century Dutch women writers
18th-century Dutch writers
Dutch autobiographers
Dutch expatriates in Spain
Dutch emigrants to South Africa
Dutch-language writers
Female wartime cross-dressers
Moroccan slaves
Women in 18th-century warfare
Writers from Amsterdam
Women in war in Spain
Women in war in the Netherlands
Women autobiographers
18th-century slaves
People who wrote slave narratives